Formerly known as "The Old Ranch House", the Jonathan Bailey House is a historic site in Whittier, California. The Bailey House was built around 1868–1869 by Jacob Gerkens. In 1887, the house was occupied by Quakers Jonathan Bailey and his wife, Rebecca. It is the oldest remaining building in Whittier. The first Quaker meetings in the area were held on the front porch of the Bailey House. In 1975, the Jonathan Bailey House was deeded to the City of Whittier and now operates as a museum by the Whittier Historical Society with maintenance by the City of Whittier Park Department with special help from volunteers. The property was added to the National Register of Historic Places in 1977.

Jonathan Bailey
Jonathan Bailey was born in Prince George County, Virginia, in 1819. When just a boy, the Bailey family relocated to Ohio along with many other Quaker families. As an adult, Jonathan Bailey married Rebecca Frazier, owned a successful mill, was a farmer, became a church and community leader, and at the age of 68, he and his wife moved to Whittier, California. The first permanent settlers and original native people of Whittier were actually the Tongva tribe. The Tongva (/ˈtɒŋvə/ tong-və) are Native Americans who inhabited the Los Angeles Basin and the Southern Channel Islands, an area covering approximately 4,000 square miles (10,000 km2).

References

External links
 Whittier Museum: Bailey House

Houses on the National Register of Historic Places in California
Houses in Los Angeles County, California
Houses completed in 1860
Museums in Los Angeles County, California
Historic house museums in California
Whittier, California
Buildings and structures on the National Register of Historic Places in Los Angeles County, California